Isla de Pasion (Passion Island) is a small island at the North end of Cozumel, Quintana Roo, Mexico. There is a tour available for visitors.

Cozumel